Journey to the Safest Place on Earth is a 2013 documentary film written and directed by Edgar Hagen. It discusses the huge quantity of radioactive waste and spent fuel rods being stored at various locations on the planet.

Charles McCombie is a Swiss-based nuclear physicist with 35 years of experience in this field, and he accompanies Hagen on a worldwide search for the best location.  One disposal site in Texas is adjacent to a location where oil drilling is in progress. A proposed disposal site in Nevada is adjacent to the young volcano Yucca Mountain.

See also

High-level radioactive waste management
List of films about nuclear issues
Yucca Mountain nuclear waste repository

References

External links
 

2013 films
2013 in the environment
Documentary films about nuclear technology
Swiss documentary films